The 2020–21 Big Ten men's basketball season began with practices in October 2020, followed by the start of the 2020–21 NCAA Division I men's basketball season in November 2020. The regular season ended in March 2021.

The Big Ten announced the season schedule on November 18, 2020 with games starting on December 13 and featuring games played on December 25 and 26. The schedule had built-in collapsible byes to attempt to make up for expected COVID-19 issues. The conference played the highest percentage of scheduled conference games in the nation, having only four games that could not be played.

With a win over rival Michigan State on March 4, 2021, Michigan won the Big Ten regular season championship based on winning percentage as the Wolverines did not play a full 20-game schedule due to COVID-19 issues. 

The Big Ten tournament was originally to be held at the United Center in Chicago, Illinois from March 10–14, 2021. However, on February 9, the conference announced the tournament would be played at Lucas Oil Stadium in Indianapolis, Indiana to better deal with testing concerns raised by the ongoing COVID-19 pandemic. Illinois defeated Ohio State in the championship game to win the Big Ten tournament and receive the conference's automatic bid to the NCAA tournament.

Iowa big man Luka Garza was named Big Ten Player of the Year for the second consecutive year. Michigan coach Juwan Howard was named Big Ten Coach of the Year. Garza and Illinois point guard Ayo Dosunmu were consensus first-team All-Americans.

In addition to Illinois, Iowa, Maryland, Michigan, Michigan State, Ohio State, Purdue, Rutgers, and Wisconsin received bids to the NCAA tournament. The nine bids to the tournament marked a conference record.

Head coaches

Coaching changes

Penn State 
On October 21, 2020, Pat Chambers resigned after an internal investigation by the school into inappropriate conduct by Chambers. It had been reported in July that former player Rasir Bolton had left the program due to comments to him by Chambers. New allegations involving Chambers surfaced after the school's investigation. Assistant coach Jim Ferry served as interim coach for the 2020–21 season.

Coaches

Notes: 
 All records, appearances, titles, etc. are from time with current school only. 
 Year at school includes 2020–21 season.
 Overall and Big Ten records are from time at current school and are through the beginning of the season. 
 Turgeon's ACC conference record excluded since Maryland began Big Ten Conference play in 2014–15.

Preseason

Preseason All-Big Ten 
On November 8, 2020, a panel of conference media selected a 10-member preseason All-Big Ten Team and Player of the Year.

Preseason national polls

Regular season

Rankings

 AP does not release a post-tournament poll.

Player of the week
Throughout the conference regular season, the Big Ten offices named one or two players of the week and one or two freshmen of the week each Monday.

Conference matrix
This table summarizes the head-to-head results between teams in conference play. Each team was scheduled to play 20 conference games, and at least one game against each opponent. However, due to COVID-19 pandemic protocols some games were cancelled, officially declared as "no contest".

Honors and awards

All-Big Ten awards and teams
On March 9, 2021, the Big Ten announced most of its conference awards.

Postseason

Big Ten tournament

NCAA tournament

The winner of the Big Ten tournament, Illinois, received the conference's automatic bid to the NCAA tournament. Nine Big Ten teams received bids to the NCAA tournament, the most of any conference in the tournament and the most in the conference's history.

References